General Baldwin may refer to:

Charles C. Baldwin (born 1947), U.S. Air Force major general
Frank Baldwin (1842–1923), U.S. Army major general
Guy Melfort Baldwin (1865–1945), British Indian Army brigadier general
James L. Baldwin (1921–1979), U.S. Army major general
Theodore Anderson Baldwin (1839–1925), U.S. Army brigadier general
William Edwin Baldwin (1827–1864), Confederate States Army brigadier general